Iowa Highway 13 (Iowa 13) is a north–south highway in eastern Iowa. The southern terminus of Iowa Highway 13 is at U.S. Highway 30 (US 30) south of Bertram and southeast of Cedar Rapids. The northern terminus is at US 52 in rural Clayton County near the towns of Monona and Farmersburg near the intersection of US 52 and US 18.

Route description
Iowa Highway 13 begins at U.S. 30 southeast of Cedar Rapids in an overlap with US 151 at a freeway interchange just east of the Cedar River.  They go north as a divided highway through Bertram.  They intersect Iowa Highway 100 at Marion and then separates from U.S. 151 in Marion as well.  It continues north from Marion to Central City, where the divided highway ends.  It goes north to Coggon, then turns east briefly before turning north again to go through Ryan.  After passing through Ryan, it goes north to Manchester, where it intersects US 20.  It continues north through Manchester and intersects Iowa 3.  It overlaps Iowa 3 and goes northwest into Strawberry Point, where they separate.  Iowa 13 then turns northeast and intersects Iowa 56 southwest of Elkader.  After running along the eastern edge of Elkader, it then intersects Iowa 128.  It then continues northeast and ends at US 52 near Farmersburg.

History
Primary Road No. 13 was one of the original routes of the primary highway system, which was formed in 1920.  Its original extent was statewide, starting at the Missouri state line south of Bloomfield and ending at the Minnesota state line north of Waukon.  When the U.S. Highway System came around in 1926, Primary Road No. 13 was shortened significantly.  The southernmost part of the route became US 63, between Ottumwa and Homestead, the route was replaced by Iowa 149, and from Homestead to Cedar Rapids, it was replaced by Iowa 150.

The route stayed more or less the same until it was shortened again in 1969.  The northernmost section of road, from McGregor to Minnesota, was renumbered to Iowa 76 to match the numbered route it became after crossing into Minnesota.  Between Froelich and McGregor, Iowa 13 overlapped US 18 and US 52.  Since 1969, the routing of Iowa 13 has not changed.

Major intersections

References

013
Transportation in Linn County, Iowa
Transportation in Delaware County, Iowa
Transportation in Clayton County, Iowa
U.S. Route 63